The Jaffa orange (Arabic: ‏برتقال يافا), also known by their Arabic name, Shamouti orange, is an orange variety with few seeds and a tough skin that makes it particularly suitable for export.

Developed by Arab farmers in the mid-19th century, the variety takes its name from the city of Jaffa where it was first produced for export. The orange was the primary citrus export for the city. It is, along with the navel and bitter orange, one of three main varieties of the fruit grown in the Mediterranean, Southern Europe, and the Middle East.  The Jaffa is cultivated in Cyprus, Iraq, Israel, Palestine, Lebanon, Syria, Jordan and Turkey.

Characteristics 
Jaffa oranges, also known as shamouti, are practically seedless, with a flavour that has been described as "excellent" and "sweet and fine". The two other main orange varieties cultivated in the region are the navel orange and the bitter orange; the latter is grown in Iran for its peel. The Jaffa orange is distinguished by its oval shape and thick peel, which is deep orange in colour and normally very easy to remove from the fruit. Its tough skin makes it "especially suitable for export". As it produces very little juice and has a tendency towards delayed bitterness, it is unsuitable for juice production, although it does store well.

These oranges are very cold-tolerant, allowing them to grow outside of the subtropical regions normally associated with growing oranges. Jaffa oranges are susceptible to Alternaria, a type of fungus, and are prone to alternate bearing.

History 

Located at the crossroads between Africa, western Asia, and Europe, Palestine produced a number of commodities for export via imperial and global distribution networks throughout the late Turkish period (1200–1900 CE). Among these were Nabulsi soap, sugar, barley, oranges, and cotton. Though cotton left its mark throughout the region, the only commodity that remains a symbol of production in Palestine is the Jaffa orange.

The Jaffa orange was a new variety developed by Arab farmers after emerging in the mid-19th century as a mutation on a tree of the 'Baladi' variety near the city of Jaffa. While the sour orange (C. aurantium) was brought westward from China and India by local traders, who may have introduced it to Sicily and Spain, the Jaffa orange was developed from the sweet orange (C. sinensis) which was brought from China to the Mediterranean region by Portuguese explorer Vasco da Gama in 1498.

After the Crimean War (1853–56), the most important innovation in local agriculture was the rapid expansion of citrus cultivation. Foremost among the varieties cultivated was the Jaffa (Shamouti) orange, and mention of it being exported to Europe first appears in British consular reports in the 1850s. One factor cited in the growth of the export market was the development of steamships in the first half of the 19th century, which enabled the export of oranges to the European markets in days rather than weeks. Another reason cited for the growth of the industry was the relative lack of European control over the cultivation of oranges compared to cotton, formerly a primary commodity crop of Palestine, but outpaced by the Jaffa orange.

Exports grew from 200,000 oranges in 1845 to 38 million oranges by 1870. The citrus plantations of this time were primarily owned by wealthy Palestinian merchants and notables, rather than small farmers, as the fruits required large capital investments with no yield for several years. Fruits carrying the "Jaffa" label were first marketed in 1870 by Sarona, a German Templer colony established in 1868. An 1872 account of Jaffa by a European traveller notes that "Surrounding Jaffa are the orange gardens for which it is justly extolled, and which are a considerable source of wealth to the owners. The annual value of fruits grown in Jaffa was said to be 10,000 pounds." In the 1880s, an American grower, H.S. Sanford, tried to cultivate the Jaffa orange in Florida.

The prosperity of the orange industry brought increased European interest and involvement in the development of Jaffa. In 1902, a study of the growth of the orange industry by Zionist officials outlined the different Palestinian owners and their primary export markets as England, Turkey, Egypt and Austria-Hungary. While the traditional Arabic cultivation methods were considered "primitive," an in-depth study of the financial expenditure involved reveals that they were ultimately more cost-efficient than the Zionist-European enterprises that followed them some two decades later.

The Zionists who immigrated to Palestine introduced the advanced cultivation methods that spurred the Jaffa orange industry. According to the Hope Simpson Enquiry of 1930,"The cultivation of the orange, introduced by the Arabs before the commencement of Jewish settlement, has developed to a very great extent in consequence of that settlement. There is no doubt that the pitch of perfection to which the technique of plantation and cultivation of the orange and grapefruit have been brought in Palestine is due to the scientific methods of the Jewish agriculturist."

Partnerships in growing and exporting these oranges were an example of Arab-Jewish cooperation despite rising political tensions.

By the end of 1928, Jews had acquired 30,000 dunams of the regions 60,000 dunams of orange orchards. Whereas before World War I, the price of a dunam of land in a fruitful orange grove was 50-75 pounds sterling, by 1929, the same groves were selling for 150-200 pounds sterling. In 1933, Jewish-owned orange production overtook Arab-owned orange production. By 1939, Jewish-owned and Arab-owned orange orchards in Palestine covered , employed over 100,000 workers, and their produce was a primary export. During World War II (1939–1945) citrus-growing declined, and Arab-owned orange production overtook Jewish-owned production.

After the 1948 war, most of the Palestinian Arab-owned orange groves were taken over by the new Israeli state. The orange-growing industry was presented as a "pioneering Labor-movement project" which was "void of any Arab presence".

Legacy
Jaffa oranges are harvested in the Israel and the Palestinian territories between November and March, with the marketing season beginning in September and extending through April. More than half the annual crop is exported, and Israel is the main provider of other citrus fruits to the European Union. In the 1950s and 1960s, Jaffa oranges became emblems of the Israeli state. A general decline in the importance of agriculture to the Israeli economy, extreme limits on available water resources, and the reliance on migrant laborers have reduced productivity. Overshadowed by manufacturing industries, such as diamonds and precision instruments, Israel nonetheless continues to export a large number of citrus fruits to Europe.

The Jaffa orange is also known for lending the city of Tel Aviv-Yafo the nickname "Big Orange".

See also 
Jaffas
Jaffa Cakes

References

Bibliography

External links 
 Orange Varieties
 120 Years of Citrus in Israel
 An orange Israeli icon turns green

Agriculture in Israel
Crops originating from Asia
Flora of Western Asia
History of Palestine (region)
Israeli brands
Orange cultivars
Products of Israel
Jaffa